Patrick Manning was the prime minister of Trinidad and Tobago from 2001 to 2010.  This page is a list of the members of his administration.

The Cabinet

Inaugural Cabinet: 26 December 2001 – 9 October 2002

28 December 2001 – 9 October 2002

7 January 2002 – 9 October 2002

8 February 2002 – 9 October 2002

5 April 2002 – 9 October 2002

Second Inaugural Cabinet: 15 October 2002 – 9 November 2003

First reshuffle: 10 November 2003 – 21 March 2004

Second reshuffle: 22 March 2004 – 13 May 2005

Third reshuffle: 14 May 2005 – 15 January 2006

Fourth reshuffle: 16 January 2006 – 28 September 2006

Fifth reshuffle: 29 September 2006 – 7 November 2007

Third Inaugural Cabinet: 8 November 2007 – 22 April 2008

Sixth reshuffle: 23 April 2008 – 25 May 2010 

Patrick Manning